Michael Todd Plehn (born 1965) is a lieutenant general in the United States Air Force, who serves as the 17th President of the National Defense University. He previously served as deputy commander of the United States Southern Command. He is a graduate of the United States Air Force Academy.

Awards and decorations

Effective dates of promotion

References

Living people
1965 births
Recipients of the Defense Superior Service Medal
Recipients of the Legion of Merit
United States Air Force Academy alumni
United States Air Force generals
Presidents of the National Defense University